Haystacks and Steeples is a 1916 American silent comedy film directed by Clarence G. Badger and starring Gloria Swanson.

Cast
 Sylvia Ashton
 Helen Bray
 George Felix
 Reggie Morris
 Della Pringle
 Gloria Swanson
 Josef Swickard
 Eva Thatcher
 Bobby Vernon as Bobby

References

External links

1916 films
1916 short films
American silent short films
American black-and-white films
1916 comedy films
Films directed by Clarence G. Badger
Films produced by Mack Sennett
Keystone Studios films
Silent American comedy films
American comedy short films
1910s American films